Mary Cynthia (Cindy) Farach-Carson is an American biochemist, known for her work in extracellular matrix, perlecan, tissue engineering and bone metastasis. She is a professor of Diagnostic and Biomedical Sciences and Director of Clinical and Translational Research  at the School of Dentistry at University of Texas Health Science Center at Houston, and an adjunct professor of biosciences and of bioengineering at Rice University.

Education 
Farach-Carson received her BS in biology at the University of South Carolina in 1978 and her PhD in biochemistry from the Medical College of Virginia at Virginia Commonwealth University in 1982.  She served as a postdoctoral fellow at the Johns Hopkins School of Medicine and MD Anderson Cancer Center.

Research contributions 
Farach-Carson serves on the editorial boards of Biomolecules and Matrix Biology.  She serves as Senior Scientist and on the Steering Committee of the Center for Theoretical Biological Physics, at Rice University.

She served as co-editor of the seven volumes reference book Topics in Bone Biology.

Awards and honors
In 2010, Farach-Carson was elected AAAS Fellow.  In 2018, she was elected AIMBE Fellow.  In 2016, she received the Presidential Mentoring Award at Rice University.  In 2021, she was given the Stephen M. Krane Award by the American Society for Bone and Mineral Research.

Selected publications

References

External links
Home page

Year of birth missing (living people)
Living people
American biochemists
University of South Carolina alumni
Medical College of Virginia alumni